Hospital Damas, formerly called Santo Asilo de Damas, is a 331-bed teaching hospital in Ponce, Puerto Rico.

History 
Hospital Damas was founded in 1863 as Santo Asilo de Damas by Sister Francisca Paz Cabrera, and it was attended to by the group known as Siervas de Maria (Servants of Mary) since 1891. The 1913 work by Eduardo Neumann Gandia states that the name of the group of ladies that founded the institution and who cared for the sick as well was Asociación de Señoras Damas del Santo Asilo de Ponce, roughly "Association of Gentle Ladies of the Holy Asylum of Ponce".

The hospital was located in downtown Ponce, but on 6 May 1973 it moved to its current location at a new 10-story tower on the north side of the Ponce By-Pass. The original location of Damas, as the current hospital is commonly called, is now home to Parque Urbano Dora Colón Clavell.

References

External links 
 Servants of Mary

Hospital buildings completed in 1863
Hospitals established in 1901
Hospitals in Ponce, Puerto Rico
1973 in Puerto Rico
1863 establishments in Puerto Rico